Heather Pringle may refer to:
 Heather L. Pringle, United States Air Force general
 Heather Pringle (writer), Canadian freelance science writer